Mitch O'Farrell (born 1960) is an American politician, who served as a member of the Los Angeles City Council for the 13th district from 2013 to 2022, during which he spent eight days as President of the City Council during the 2022 Los Angeles City Council scandal. A member of the Democratic Party, O'Farrell was the first Native American elected to the body, and was one of its two openly gay members until the end of his second term in 2022.

Early life 
Mitch O'Farrell was born in Oklahoma in 1960, and raised in the Oklahoma City suburb of Moore, Oklahoma. He grew up in a farming community. His mother was an administrative assistant and his father was a Teamster truck driver. O'Farrell is a member of the Wyandotte Nation, and is the first Native American to be elected to the Los Angeles City Council.

Career 
O'Farrell first moved to Los Angeles in 1982 for an audition. During the 1980s, he pursued a career in the arts and was a professional dancer and actor. He has lived in Glassell Park since 1992.

O’Farrell quickly became an active member of the Glassell Park and greater Los Angeles community. Most notably, he was elected President of the Glassell Park Improvement Association and helped form the Glassell Park Neighborhood Council. O’Farrell also served as president of the Northeast Democratic Club, and regularly volunteered at local non-profits including the Wildlife Waystation, Project Angel Food, and the Santa Cecilia Orchestra. In 2002, he was hired by then-Councilmember Garcetti to work in his office, where he remained for ten years. O'Farrell served as a field deputy, deputy director, district director, and finally as senior advisor.

Los Angeles City Council (2013—2022)

Elections

2013 
In 2013, O'Farrell ran for the City Council seat held by Garcetti, where he faced former Public Works Commissioner and labor activist John Choi. The contest between O'Farrell and Choi was noted for being unusually contentious. During the campaign, Choi accusing O'Farrell of xenophobia during the contest over a campaign flier that included "a grainy picture of him above the words “not from our community.” O'Farrell responded by saying that "I didn’t like it anymore than you did, John" and noted it was from an independent group, but also noted that "[t]he fact is my opponent is new to the district... “I am the local candidate.”

During the campaign, he was endorsed by many elected officials including Councilmembers Ed Reyes of the 1st district and Tom LaBonge of the 4th district. After a tumultuous campaign, O'Farrell won in the runoff of the election, receiving 53.05% to John Choi's 46.94%.

2017 
O'Farrell was reelected with 59.26% of the vote (17,053 votes) in a wide-open contest. During the campaign, O'Farrell was endorsed in his reelection bid by Mayor Eric Garcetti and local chambers of commerce, among other politicians and organizations. Coming in second place was challenger Sylvie Shane, a founding member of the LA Tenants Union, who received 15.07% of the vote. Jessica Salans, who was endorsed by the Green Party and would later become chief of staff to Councilwoman Nithya Raman, came in a close third place.

2022 
It was speculated that O'Farrell would receive a challenge from a progressive candidate in the 2022 election. Police abolitionist Albert Corado, homelessness policy advisor Kate Pynoos, and UNITE HERE organizer Hugo Soto-Martinez challenged O'Farrell from the left; Sheriff's Deputy Steve Johnson also ran against O'Farrell.

In October, O'Farrell became Acting President of the City Council for eight days following Nury Martinez's resignation in wake of the 2022 Los Angeles City Council controversy.

O'Farrell conceded the 2022 election to Soto-Martinez on November 15.

Tenure 

As the first Native American to serve on the Los Angeles City Council, O'Farrell has championed indigenous issues. He proposed and successfully established the creation of Indigenous Peoples Day in Los Angeles, and was endorsed by Chief Billy Friend of the Wyandotte Nation nearly a decade ago, during his 2013 City Council campaign.

O'Farrell has been a supporter of expanding the City's housing stock, particularly of covenanted affordable housing. During his time in office, over 4,300 units of covenanted affordable housing were built in Council District 13.

O'Farrell is described as having "spearheaded efforts to remove the camp" of homeless people at Echo Park Lake during a widely-publicized and controversial police-led action to sweep out the unhoused and temporarily close the historically popular city park towards the end of the COVID19 pandemic. O'Farrell has been criticized for "not doing more to ensure the safety of those living in the encampment". As head of the City Council's Homelessness and Poverty Committee, O'Farrell has spoken in favor of limiting which sidewalks homeless people would be allowed to sleep on.

After removal of the encampment, O'Farrell's office significantly altered the layout and nature of Echo Park Lake, erecting an enormous security fence enclosing the previously wide-open community park, restricting access to a small number of specific discrete entrances, contracting private security to monitor the park, and adding surveillance cameras that cover "every inch of the park". 

Despite claims by O'Farrell's office that the unhoused residents would be placed into permanent supportive housing, today, out of the 200 or so residents who were swept from Echo Park Lake, only around 9 are in permanent housing. Several have since died, and many more have disappeared from official records.

O'Farrell has focused on improving animal rights. O'Farrell notes that his work has led to the banning of coyote snare traps in Los Angeles, which he describes as "one of his proud accomplishments" in his official biography.

Personal life 
O'Farrell is openly gay. He resides with his partner George Brauckman in Glassell Park.

Electoral history

2013

2017

2022

References

External links 
 Council District 13 official website
 

|-

|-

1960 births
21st-century Native American politicians
California Democrats
Gay politicians
American LGBT city council members
LGBT people from California
Living people
Presidents of the Los Angeles City Council
Native American city councillors
People from Moore, Oklahoma
Wyandot people
LGBT people from Oklahoma
21st-century LGBT people
LGBT Native Americans